The 1994–95 season was the 106th season in existence for Sheffield United, during which they played in Division One under manager Dave Bassett, having been relegated from the Premier League the previous season. With  various factions attempting to take over the club, little money was invested in the side and they were unable to make an immediate return to the Premier League, finishing 8th.

Ground
Bramall Lane operated with only three sides during the season as the old John Street Stand had been demolished.

Season overview
Following relegation from the Premier League, the season before the club had little funds to try to mount a sustained promotion push.  During the summer, Carl Bradshaw had been sold to Norwich City for £500,000 and Tom Cowan to Huddersfield Town for a further £200,000.  They were replaced by two cut-priced Australians, Doug Hodgson and Carl Veart, who cost £30,000 and £150,000 respectively.

Players

First-team squad

Squad statistics

|}

Transfers

In

Loan in

Out

Loan out

League table

References

Sheffield United
Sheffield United F.C. seasons